Alex "Boo" Ellis (February 11, 1936 – May 6, 2010) was an American professional basketball player for the Minneapolis Lakers of the National Basketball Association (NBA).

Ellis grew up in Hamilton, Ohio and attended Hamilton High School. He led the school to 25–3 record and a 1954 state championship as a senior, garnering first team all-state and state tournament MVP honors that year. Ellis then went on to play college basketball for Niagara University.

A , 185 lb. forward/center, he quickly became a dominant force in both scoring and rebounding. Since the rules back then did not allow freshmen to play varsity sports, Ellis had to wait until his sophomore year in 1955–56 to suit up officially for the Purple Eagles. In his three seasons, he accumulated 1,656 points and a still-standing school record 1,533 rebounds. In his first season of eligibility, Ellis grabbed a school single season record 485 rebounds, only to break his own record the next two consecutive years with 522 and 526, respectively. During a game against Kent State in his junior year, he recorded a 31-point, 31-rebound effort. In Ellis' final season, he led NCAA Division I in rebounding and was named the Western New York Athlete of the Year. He also guided the Purple Eagles to two National Invitation Tournament (NIT) berths in his three-year career.

Following his standout collegiate career, the Minneapolis Lakers selected him as the first pick in the third round (16th overall) in the 1958 NBA draft. After two NBA seasons, Ellis played six seasons in the Continental League and three with the Marcus Haynes Fabulous Magicians, a traveling professional team. In his later life, Ellis worked as a security guard in his hometown of Hamilton. He spent two and a half years of his life living with his daughter in Indianapolis, before succumbing the effects of a heart attack he had suffered two weeks earlier. Ellis died on May 6, 2010 at age 74.

See also
List of NCAA Division I men's basketball season rebounding leaders

References

1936 births
2010 deaths
Allentown Jets players
Basketball players from Ohio
Centers (basketball)
Minneapolis Lakers draft picks
Minneapolis Lakers players
Niagara Purple Eagles men's basketball players
Power forwards (basketball)
Sportspeople from Hamilton, Ohio
Wilkes-Barre Barons players
American men's basketball players